This is a list of guitars manufactured by ESP Guitars.

ESP Original Series (Japan)

Guitars

Basses
ESP AP
ESP Bottom Bump
ESP Bottom Line
ESP Forest
ESP XJ
ESP Halibut
ESP Amaze
ESP Viper

ESP Standard Series (United States)

Guitars

Basses
Including ESP's budget line, LTD
ESP AX Series - produced in the United States and Europe. The design of the guitars in the AX Series is similar to that of the B.C. Rich Warlock. All of the AX guitars feature a string-thru body with a Tune-O-Matic Bridge. All of them also feature one volume and one tone control knob with a 3-way toggle with a pickup formation of H-H. The series began in 2003 with only the AX-350. In 2005, the AX-350 was discontinued and was replaced with the AX-400, AX-250, and the AX-50. The AX-250 is very similar to the AX-350 except that it is made with bolt-on neck construction instead of neck-thru like its predecessor and the pickups are not EMG HZs but instead are EMG-ESP LH-300's. Notable users of models in the AX Series include Makro, Peter Scheithauer, and Robb Flynn.
ESP LTD AX-50 - The AX-50 features bolt-on neck construction in a 25.5" scale. The fingerboard features dot inlays with the model name on the 12th fret. It has 24 extra jumbo frets. It comes in silver satin and black satin with black hardware.
ESP LTD AX-250
ESP LTD AX-260 - features neck-thru construction in a 25.5" scale. The fingerboard features a custom tribal inlay. It has 24 extra jumbo frets. It comes in black with black hardware.
ESP LTD AX-350
ESP LTD AX-400 - features set-in neck construction in a 25.5" scale. The fingerboard features a custom tribal inlay. It has 24 extra jumbo frets and an Earvana compensated nut. It comes in see-through black or see-through red with black hardware and white binding on the neck.
ESP Bottom Line
ESP D
ESP Eclipse
ESP EX Series
ESP EX-50 - comes in black or silver. It's the cheapest in the ESP/LTD EX range.
ESP Forest
ESP Surveyor
ESP Vintage
ESP VIPER

LTD Deluxe Series (U.S. and Europe)
The Deluxe Series includes models based on the popular ESP product lines of Eclipse, MH, Horizon, M, and Viper guitars. They include many high-end features. The Deluxe Series began with only four models in 2003.

ESP Custom Series
ESP Alexi Laiho Series
ESP Alexi Laiho Arrow Head "Custom Shop" - available in the Japanese market only.
ESP Alexi Laiho Pink Saw Tooth "Custom Shop"
ESP Alexi Laiho Saw Tooth "Custom Shop"
ESP Alexi Laiho Signature Model - based on the guitar that Laiho plays, but with a longer lower section. It come in white with black pinstripes or black with yellow pinstripes.
ESP Alexi Laiho Scythe "Custom Shop"
ESP Alexi Laiho Scythe "Standard" - features an ebony fingerboard with scythe inlays. 
ESP Edwards E-AL-128 Arrow Head
ESP Edwards E-AL-120 Saw Tooth
ESP Edwards E-AL-120 Scythe
ESP LTD Alexi - 200
ESP LTD Alexi - 600
ESP LTD Alexi - 600 SE
ESP USA Alexi Laiho "Custom Shop"
ESP USA Alexi Laiho "Standard"
ESP Dan Jacobs EX - distributed as the ESP LTD DJ-600 - the same model as the guitars in the EX series, with several changes: the headstock is reversed, it uses an EMG 85 pickup in the neck rather than an EMG 60, it has Grover tuners, and it has a Floyd Rose bridge. The tone knob has been replaced by an EMG Afterburner. 
ESP Dave Mustaine - ESP produced several guitars based on the custom models of Dave Mustaine until 2007, when he left the brand for Dean Guitars.  The DV models lack a 24th fret inlay.
ESP Axxion - fretboard is ebony with XX inlays and available in black.
ESP DV8 - fretboard is ebony with 8-Ball Inlay on first fret. It is available in black, snow white and metallic silver.
ESP LTD DV-200 - fretboard is rosewood with 8-Ball Inlay on first fret and available in black.
ESP LTD DV8-R - fretboard is rosewood with 8-Ball inlay on first fret. It is available in black, metallic silver and snow white, and a SE Flame Burst.
ESP LTD V-200
ESP LTD V-500
ESP Kirk Hammett
ESP KH-1 - Flying V Model, 22 frets
ESP KH-2 - Black finished, Bolt-on construction, Skull-Crossbones inlays, EMG-81(B) EMG-60(N) pickups, 24 frets
ESP KH-2 Vintage - Black finished, Neck-thru-body construction, Skull-Crossbones inlays, EMG-81(B) EMG-60(N) pickups, 24 frets
ESP KH-3 - Black finished, Spider & Skull-Crossbones inlays, EMG-81(B) pickups, 24 frets
ESP KH-4 - Base on ESP M-II model, Black finished with White pearl pickguard, 24 frets
ESP KH-DC - STBC (See Thru Black Cherry) finished, EMG-81(B) EMG-60(N) pickups, 22 frets, launched 2012.

ESP Stephen Carpenter Series
ESP Stef Carpenter
ESP Stef-B7
ESP Stef-B8
ESP LTD SC-607
ESP LTD SC-607B
ESP LTD SC-608B
ESP LTD SC-600
ESP LTD SC-200
ESP RZK-1 - A guitar specially for Richard Kruspe, lead guitarist of Rammstein. It has a platinum silver painting and the Rammstein logo on it.
ESP Eclipse - features neck-thru construction in a 24.75" scale. The fingerboard features flag inlays with ESP at the 12th fret. It has 22 extra jumbo frets and a graphite nut. It comes in black and black cherry with black hardware. The binding is natural on the body and white on the neck and headstock. The tuning pegs are Sperzel locking tuners.
ESP Horizon - features one volume and one tone control knob with a 3-way toggle, high-end pickups, and other high-end features. The Horizon features neck-thru construction in a 25.5" scale. The fingerboard features pearl offset block inlays with ESP at the 12th fret. It has 24 extra jumbo frets. It comes in see-through aqua and amber sunburst with black hardware. The binding is natural on the body and white on the neck and headstock. The tuning pegs are Sperzel locking tuners.
ESP Horizon 3 Custom - features neck-thru construction in a 25.5" scale. The fingerboard features dot inlays with ESP at the 12th fret. It has 24 extra jumbo frets. It comes in see-through aqua and amber sunburst with black hardware and white binding on the neck and headstock. The tuning pegs are Sperzel locking tuners. It was discontinued after 2004. It varied from that Horizon in that it was more rounded, with a longer upper claw.
ESP Michael Paget Signature Series - the successor to the Dave Mustaine/DV series.  Its feature new pickups, an EMG-81 in the bridge, and an EMG-85 in the neck.  Unlike its predecessor, it no longer has a pickguard.
ESP VIPER - features one volume and one tone control knob with a 3-way toggle, high-end pickups, and other high-end features. The VIPER features neck-thru construction in a 24.75" scale. The fingerboard features flag inlays with ESP at the 12th fret. It has 24 extra jumbo frets and a graphite nut. It comes in black and black cherry with black hardware and white binding on the neck and headstock. The tuning pegs are Sperzel locking tuners.

LTD Standard Series

ESP Grass Roots Series
The ESP Grass Roots brand is solely for the Japanese market. Grass Roots guitars are aimed at the low cost market. Like the other Japan-only line of ESP, Edwards, there are online dealerships for such guitars. When production first started in the early 1990s, Grassroots Guitars were produced in Japan, but they are now produced in Korea.

ESP Navigator Series
(Japanese-market only guitars)

Noted musicians and users of ESP Navigator guitars are: Sugizo (Japan), Ramon Goose (UK), Ken Yokoyama (Japan) also Mick Taylor used Arlen Roths Navigator N-LP for the hotlicks video.

ESP Edwards Series
Edwards guitar series consist of very high quality copies of legendary guitars like the Les Paul, Telecaster, and Stratocaster, and also original ESP designs. The Edwards Les Paul, Tele, and Strat guitars are built specifically for the Japanese market, and are not sold in the US as they contravene Gibson and Fender patents; they can however be imported by individual buyers. Many prominent Japanese artists have Edwards series signature models along with a few International artists, such as Alexi Laiho of Children of Bodom, Anchang of Sex Machineguns, and Aiji of LM.C.

ESP Edwards Thru-neck Series
Edwards E-CY-165CTM
Edwards E-CY-130D
Edwards E-HR-135QM
Edwards E-HR-130
Edwards E-HR-135
Edwards E-FR-130GT
Edwards E-FR-145GT/QM
Edwards E-RV-148
Edwards E-BT-110B
Edwards E-FR-110B
ESP Edwards Original Series

ESP Edwards Lacquer Taste Series

ESP Edwards Mini Guitar Series
Edwards E-LP-45S/M
Edwards E-LP-43C/M
Artist Models

ESP Signature Series 
ESP Jesper Stromblad
ESP James Hetfield
ESP Kirk Hammett
ESP Jake E. Lee
ESP Dave Mustaine
ESP George Lynch
ESP Alexi Laiho
ESP Stephen Carpenter
ESP Jeff Hanneman
ESP Michael Amott
ESP Richard Z
ESP Page Hamilton
ESP Ron Wood
ESP Max Cavalera
ESP Michael Wilton
ESP Dan Jacobs
ESP Travis Miguel
ESP Ahrue Luster
ESP Jardel Paisante
ESP Tom Araya
ESP Wayne Static
 ESP Gus G
 ESP Emppu Vuorinen
 ESP Metin Türkcan
 ESP Mark Helymun
 ESP Gabe Crisp
 ESP Dan Kenny
 ESP Ronni Le Tekrø

Comparison chart

See also
ESP Guitars
ESP Lakland
Deftones

References

External links
List of guitars at ESPguitars.com
List of basses at ESpguitars.com

 
Manufacturing-related lists